Malcolm Whitman defeated Dwight F. Davis in the All Comers final, 3–6, 6–2, 6–2, 6–1 to win the men's singles tennis title at the 1898 U.S. National Championships. Two-time reigning champion Robert Wrenn did not defend his title.

Draw

Challenge round

Finals

Earlier rounds

Section 1

Section 2

Section 3

Section 4

References 
 

Men's singles
1898